"The Tale of Cross-eyed Lefty from Tula and the Steel Flea", The Tale of the Crosseyed Lefthander from Tula and the Steel Flea or simply Levsha (left-handed), sometimes called The Lefthander, Lefty, The Steel Flea or The Left-handed Craftsman is a well-known 1881 skaz (story) by Nikolai Leskov. Styled as a folk tale, it tells a story of a left-handed arms craftsman from Tula (traditionally a center of the Russian armaments industry) who outperformed his English colleagues by providing a clockwork steel flea he'd made with horseshoes and inscriptions on them.

Synopsis
Tsar Alexander I of Russia, while visiting England with his servant the Cossack Platov, is shown a variety of modern inventions. Platov keeps insisting that things in Russia are much better (embarrassing a guide at one point when he finds something that appears well made that turns out to be a Russian gun), until they are shown a small mechanical flea. After his ascension the next tsar, Nicolas I, orders Platov (after he tries to hide the flea) to find someone to outperform the English who had created the clockwork steel flea (as small as a crumb, and the key to wind it up can only be seen through a microscope). Platov travels to Tula to find someone to better the English invention.  Three gunsmiths agree to do the work and barricade themselves in a workshop.  Villagers try to get them to come out in various ways (for example by yelling "fire"), but no one can get them to come out.  When Platov arrives to check on their progress, he has some Cossacks try to open the workshop.  They succeed in getting the roof to come off, but the crowd is disgusted when the trapped smell of body odor and metal work comes out of the workshop.  The gunsmiths hand Platov the same flea he gave them and he curses them, believing that they have done absolutely nothing.  He ends up dragging Lefty with him in order to have someone to answer for the failure.

The flea is given to the czar, to whom Lefty explains that he needs to look closer and closer at the flea to see what they have achieved.  He winds it up and finds that it doesn't move.  He discovers that, without any microscopes ("We are poor people"), Lefty and his accomplices managed to put appropriately sized horseshoes (with the craftsmen's engraved signatures) on the flea (Lefty made the nails, which cannot be seen since they are so small), which amazes the Tsar and the English (even though the flea now cannot dance as it used to). Lefty then gets an invitation and travels to England to study the English way of life and technical accomplishments. The English hosts try to talk him into staying in England, but he feels homesick and returns to Russia at the earliest opportunity. On the way back, he engages in a drinking duel with an English sailor, arriving in Saint Petersburg.  The sailor is treated well, but the authorities finding no identification on Lefty and believing him to be a common drunkard, send him off to die in a hospital for unknowns.

The sailor, after sobering up, decides to find his new friend, and with the aid of Platov they locate him.  While dying (his head is smashed from being thrown onto the pavement), he tells them to tell the Emperor to stop having his soldiers clean their muskets with crushed brick (after he sees a dirty gun in England and realizes it fires so well because they keep it oily).  The message never arrives, however, because the man who had to inform the Emperor never does.  Leskov comments that the Crimean War might have turned out differently if the message had been delivered.  The story ends with Leskov commenting on the replacement of good, hard-earned labor and creativity with machines.

Style
This story is deeply embedded into Russian consciousness as an archetype of relationships between Russia and the West. The language of the story is unique; many of its folk-flavored neologisms and colloquialisms (many of them being replacements of borrowed non-Slavic words, very funny and natural, though mostly invented by Leskov) have become common sayings and proverbs. Both Slavophiles and Westernizers used the story in support of their views; indeed the story of Levsha may signify amazing Russian ingenuity and craftsmanship,  it also exposes the Russian society which neglects most talented Russian people.

Cultural influence
In 1952, a ballet adaption was developed by Boris Alexandrovich Alexandrov and P. F. Abolimov. In order to maximize the ballet's patriotic message, the story was changed so that the flea keeps its leap and Lefty survives to return home to a love interest. The libretto was thought clumsy by the Central Committee of the All-Union Communist Party, however, and the ballet was only ever staged twice, in 1954 and 1976.

In 1964, Soviet director Ivan Ivanov-Vano made an animated 42-minute-long film called Lefty (Левша) that was based on the story.

A live-action film The Left-Hander was made in 1986. This version is played several times a day at the Museum of Jurassic Technology.

The book describes a microscope which can magnify up to five million times, similar to actual microscopes that are now being used in nanotechnology. For this reason it is featured in a Nature Physics article from 2007.

In the Russian language, the hero's nickname, Levsha (Lefty), has become a reference to an exceptionally skilled common-folk craftsman, and the expression "to shoe a flea" has become an idiomatic phrase signifying a craftsman's feat.

Translations into English 

 Isabel F. Hapgood (1916) as "The Steel Flea"
 Babette Deutsch and Avrahm Yarmolinsky (1943) as "The Steel Flea"
David Magarshack (1946) as "The Left-Handed Artificer"
William B. Edgerton (1969) as "The Steel Flea"
 Richard Pevear and Larissa Volokhonsky (2013) as "Lefty"

See also 
 Nanotechnology in fiction

References

External links 
 Isabel Hapgood 1916 translation: page images, or transcribed text.
The Russian text of Levsha in Moshkov's Library
English translation of The Tale of Cross-eyed Lefty from Tula and the Steel Flea
   

The Borzoi Kabinet Theater at the Museum of Jurassic Technology of Los Angeles, California screens the film "Levsha, the Cross-Eyed Lefty from Tula and the Steel Flea" at hourly intervals.  Visitors are encouraged to take tea afterwards in the Tula Tearoom.
Spanish translation of the novel by Editorial Impedimenta

Works by Nikolai Leskov
Russian short stories
1881 short stories
Science in fiction by theme
Short stories adapted into films